is a stratovolcano in the Tokara Islands of Japan. It is the largest mountain on Nakanoshima, which is part of the village of Toshima in Kagoshima District of Kagoshima Prefecture. Being the largest mountain on a small island, it is also referred to as Nakanoshima. It is also called "Tokara Fuji" from its shape.

The mountain is an andesitic volcano. The volcano had a minor mud eruption in January 1914. In October 1949, the summit crater produced an ash cloud. The rock of the mountain is non-alkali mafic rock produced in the last 18,000 years.

Sulphur mining took place on the southeast flank until 1944. During the rainy season, the summit crater fills with water.

See also
 List of volcanoes in Japan

References 

Mountains of Kagoshima Prefecture
Volcanoes of Kagoshima Prefecture